Sean Polwart (born 14 April 1990) is a former New Zealand rugby union player who played as a flanker for Auckland in the ITM Cup.

Additionally Polwart was a member of the  squad during the 2015 season, for whom he played in one match.

Internationally, Polwart won the 2010 IRB Junior World Championship with the  team, scoring 2 tries in 5 games. He has also represented the Maori All Blacks.

In early 2017, Polwart announced his retirement from playing due to a serious concussion injury suffered in 2015 while training with the Chiefs.

References

External links
 Sean Polwart itsrugby.co.uk Player Statistics

1990 births
New Zealand rugby union players
Rugby union flankers
Blues (Super Rugby) players
Auckland rugby union players
Chiefs (rugby union) players
Rugby union players from Auckland
Living people
Māori All Blacks players